Ben Cruachan is a mountain that rises to , the highest in Argyll and Bute, Scotland. It gives its name to the Cruachan Dam, a pumped-storage hydroelectric power station located in a cavern inside the mountain. It is the high point of a ring of mountains, known as the Cruachan Horseshoe, that surrounds the power station reservoir. The horseshoe includes a further Munro (Stob Diamh), a Corbett (Beinn a' Bhuiridh), and several subsidiary summits. "Cruachan!" is the battle cry of Highland clans Campbell and MacIntyre.

See also 
 Ben Cruachan Quarry Branch
 Cailleach
 Falls of Cruachan railway station
 List of Munro mountains
 Mountains and hills of Scotland

References

External links 

 Computer generated Summit Panorama Ben Cruachan index
 Visit Cruachan - Ben Cruachan, the Hollow Mountain - visitors' information

Marilyns of Scotland
Munros
Mountains and hills of Argyll and Bute
Mountains and hills of the Southern Highlands
One-thousanders of Scotland